This is a list of the Sites of Special Scientific Interest (SSSIs) on the Isle of Wight, England. The Isle of Wight is an island and county three miles off the south coast of England in the English Channel. Its geology is complex, with a chalk downland ridge running east to west through its centre and important fossil beds from the Lower Cretaceous to the Lower Tertiary around the coast. This geology gives rise to many distinct habitats, with strong maritime influences, including chalk grassland, neutral meadows, and broad-leaved woodland. The Isle of Wight has a population of 140,000, making it one of the country's smaller counties in terms of population.

In England, the body responsible for designating SSSIs is Natural England, which chooses a site because of its fauna, flora, geological or physiographical features. Natural England took over the role of designating and managing SSSIs from English Nature in October 2006, when it was formed from the amalgamation of English Nature, parts of the Countryside Agency, and the Rural Development Service. , there are 41 sites designated in this Area of Search; of these, 26 have been designated for their biological interest, 4 for their geological interest, and 11 for both.

The data in the table is taken from citation sheets for each SSSI, available at their website.

Sites

Notes 
Data rounded to one decimal place.
Grid reference is based on the British national grid reference system, also known as OSGB36, and is the system used by the Ordnance Survey.
Link to maps using the Nature on the Map service provided by English Nature.
Arreton Down was originally notified as a geological SSSI, but was then renotified in 1987 for its biological interest only.
This site includes three former SSSIs known as St Helen’s Duver, Brading Marshes and St. Helen’s Ledges. They were notified in 1951, 1971 and 1977 respectively.
This also includes the former SSSI, Hart’s Farm Meadows which was designated in 1986.
This site was formerly known as Gurnard Ledge to Saltmead Ledge SSSI and was extended in 1987.

References 

 
Wight
Sites of Special Scientific Interest